Ana Isabel Pantoja Bernal (Seville, July 15, 1986), known as Anabel Pantoja is a Spanish TV personality. She is known for her participation in programs of the media group Mediaset España, especially those produced by La Fábrica de la tele such as Sálvame, Deluxe or El programa de Ana Rosa.

Biography 
Anabel Pantoja was born in Seville on July 15, 1986, into an artist family that included her aunt, the tonadillera Isabel Pantoja, and her uncle, the singer Agustín Pantoja. She is also the cousin of Kiko Rivera and Isa Pantoja. She left Seville to study in Madrid y se formó como maquilladora, convirtiéndose en la asistente de su tía. and trained as a makeup artist, becoming her aunt's assistant. She started in the world of television in 2011 as a collaborator on El programa de Ana Rosa on Telecinco.

She continued in television with Telecinco in the program Mujeres y hombres y viceversa between 2013 and 2016, where she was a commentator. In 2014 she signed on as a contestant of Supervivientes, being the second expelled after fifteen days of coexistence. Between 2015 and 2017 she was also a collaborator of ¡Qué tiempo tan feliz!, while in 2016 she signed on as a contestant of Levántate All Stars, presented by Jesús Vázquez, both on Telecinco.

In 2015, she begins to participate in the Gran Hermano 16 debate and the daily television program Sálvame, where she begins with sporadic collaborations. Her contributions to the program have grown in importance over time, and she has gained a large following among the general public, particularly on social media, where she has over one million followers on Instagram. In 2019, she became a contestant in Gran Hermano VIP, being the first expelled, and in 2020 she participated in El tiempo del descuento, reaching the final. In September 2020, she became the first participant of Solos/Solas on Mitele Plus.

In 2018, she started an entrepreneurial career by opening a nail business and working as a designer of a swimwear collection and the jewelry brand Lueli. In addition, she works as a social media influencer. In her facet as an influencer, she highlights her viral video dancing, which was picked up by a famous Korean singer of the group Loona, in which she tried to imitate it. In 2021, she also started designing accessories. In addition, she participates as a protagonist in a video clip by the Portuguese artist Nininho Vaz Maia.

In the summer of 2021, she was the star of a short Telecinco documentary called Anabel, al desnudo.

Trajectory

Realities

Published works

Awards and nominations

References

External links 
 Anabel Pantoja on Instagram

Living people
Spanish television personalities
Spanish women television presenters
1986 births